The International Institute in Geneva (IIG) -- formerly known as International University in Geneva - IUN or IUG), founded in 1997, is a private business school   in Geneva, Switzerland. The business school is located in the International Centre Cointrin, next to Geneva Airport.

History 
Its first president was David Williamson (former president of DuPont). IIG has 270 students.

Academic programs 
The International Institute in Geneva offers undergraduate and graduate programs in several disciplines, including relations, and communications, science, administration, management, and trade & finance. The business school offers joint degrees at the Bachelor and Graduate levels with Plymouth University, UK. Students may select a unique option: the IIG master in IR and extending their studies to include an individual research dissertation to gain the award of MA-IR at University of Plymouth (UK) without leaving Geneva. A partnership with Boston University, USA, is also giving an opportunity to earn a double degree with the opportunity to study in Boston. A Doctorate in Business Administration jointly offered with Plymouth University is also available.

Accreditation
 ACBSP private (US) programmatic accreditation. 
 IACBE private (US) programmatic accreditation.
 BAC   private (UK) Independent Higher Education Institution (IHEI) accreditation.

People
The president is Eric Willumsen (founder and executive vice-president). The chancellor is Claude Martin, former Director General of World Wide Fund for Nature. Nigerian chief trade negotiator Chiedu Osakwe was adjunct professor till 2017.

Exchange programmes
IIG developed educational affiliation agreements for study-abroad in North and South America including Boston University, Tulane in New Orleans, IUP in Pennsylvania, MIIS in California, UConn in Connecticut, Champlain College in Vermont, Anahuac University in Mexico City, Universidad Externado de Colombia in Colombia and Universidad de San Ignacio de Loyola in Peru. 

Finally IIG also developed affiliation agreements for study-abroad in Asia with the Indian Institute of Foreign Trade, New Delhi - India.  need valid sources

Extra-curricular activities
IIG has a Model UN Team that participates in Harvard WorldMUN and United Ambassadors MUNC Geneva conferences organized annually. Additionally IIG has a football team that practices regularly and plays matches with other university teams in Geneva.

References

External links
 Official Site - International Institute in Geneva - www.iig.ch

Business schools in Switzerland
International universities
International business
1997 establishments in Switzerland
Educational institutions established in 1997
Schools in Geneva